Seoul Metropolitan Subway Line 1 of the Seoul Metropolitan Subway is a rapid transit and commuter rail line which links central Seoul, South Korea to Soyosan Station in the northeast, Incheon in the southwest, and Sinchang (Soonchunhyang Univ.) via Suwon and Cheonan in the south. The central underground portion of this rail line is the oldest subway section in the Seoul Metropolitan Subway system. Its branches and services cover a large part of the Seoul Capital Area; totaling  in route length.

The underground section between Seoul Station and Cheongnyangni station, which is referred to as Seoul Metro Line 1, is currently operated by Seoul Metro. The line first opened in 1974 as the '''Korean National Railroad of Seoul''' with through services to national mainline railways from Seongbuk station (now: Kwangwoon University station) to Incheon and Suwon Stations. At the time, the  underground portion run by Seoul Metro Corporation—one of Seoul Metro's predecessors—was called Line 1 and labeled red on maps. On the other hand, the remaining sections of the rail line run by Korail were labeled either blue or gray on maps, and the express lines were red. In 2000, the adjacent through-running Korail services from the Gyeongbu, Gyeongin and Gyeongwon Lines were officially bundled together as part of a greater Line 1, and the labeling on maps was changed to the current dark blue color.

Frequent service is provided between Soyosan, Dongducheon, Uijeongbu, Cheongnyangni, Seoul, Yongsan, and Guro, where trains split between Incheon in the west and Byeongjeom and Cheonan in the south. Express trains operate from Yongsan and Seoul stations to Dongincheon and Sinchang(Soonchunhyang Univ.) stations. Trains run every 3-6 min in the central route between Seoul Station and Cheongnyangni, every 6-9 min between Seoul and Guro, every 8-10 min between Guro and Incheon and between Guro and Byeongjeom, every 10-15 min from Byeongjeom to Cheonan, and every 35 min between Cheonan and Sinchang and service up to the Dongducheon area and Soyosan station.

Trains travel along Gyeongbu (Seoul-Cheonan), Gyeongin (Guro-Incheon), Janghang (Cheonan-Sinchang(Soonchunhyang Univ.)), and Gyeongwon (Hoegi-Soyosan) railway lines. The line runs on the left-hand side of the track, as opposed to the right-hand side of the track like all other Seoul Metropolitan Subway lines (another exception to this is Seoul Subway Line 4 although it runs on the right-hand side until Namtaeryeong station, and operates on the left-hand side for the parts afterwards) since railways in Korea generally run on the left side.

Rapid (Express) trains 
Korail operates a variety of express "rapid" (Korean: 급행 geup-haeng, Hanja: 急行) trains for long distance commuter services on Line 1. These services include:
 Gyeongin line express services from Yongsan to Dongincheon, operating express between Guro and Dongincheon, including:
 Regular express services, introduced on January 29, 1999, following quadruple-tracking of the Gyeongin Line.
 Faster limited express (Korean: 특급 teuk-geup) trains, introduced on July 7, 2017.
  Gyeongbu line express services from Cheongnyangni to Cheonan or Sinchang, operating express between Gasan Digital Complex and Cheonan and running local elsewhere.
 Green Gyeongbu line express service from Seoul Station to Cheonan or Sinchang, originating at a platform adjacent to Seoul Station, skipping all stations between Seoul Station and Geumcheon-gu Office Station, making intermediate stops at Anyang, Gunpo, Uiwang, and Sungkyunkwan University, and then following the red Gyeongbu line express service pattern south of Suwon. Northbound services (departing from Cheonan/Sinchang and terminating at Seoul Station) stop at Yeongdeungpo station, but southbound services are unable to due to the lack of a raised platform. This service was introduced on September 25, 1982.
 Gyeongwon line express services from Dongducheon (although several trains originate from Soyosan) to Incheon, operating express between Dongducheon and Kwangwoon University and running local between Incheon and Kwangwoon University.

Former express services include:
 One late night Gyeongin line express service that originated at Soyosan, made all stops to Guro, then made express stops until Incheon.
 Yeongdeungpo-Byeongjeom Gyeongbu line express service, skipping all stations between Yeongdeungpo and Anyang and then following the Yeongsan-Cheonan/Sinchang express service pattern south of Anyang until Byeongjeom. This service was introduced on August 25, 2014 and was discontinued on December 9, 2016.
 Two faster Yongsan-Sinchang limited express trains (one in each direction), introduced in 2013. This train only operated on weekends and holidays. It was discontinued on July 1, 2018.

Electrifcation 
Seoul Subway Line 1 is powered by 1500 V direct current between Cheongnyangni station and Seoul Station, and by 25000 V alternating current elsewhere. Because of this different manner of offering electric current, there are neutral sections between Cheongnyangni station and Hoegi station, as well as between Seoul Station and Namyeong station.

Stations

Main Lines 
Local lines:
 Soyosan, Dongducheon, Uijeongbu or Yangju — Incheon
 Uijeongbu (3 times only on weekdays), Kwangwoon Univ. or Cheongnyangni — Cheonan, Sinchang, or Seodongtan
 Yeongdeungpo — Gwangmyeong (shuttle)

Express lines:
 GW: Gyeongwon Express (Soyosan or Dongducheon - Incheon)
 GI: Gyeongin Express (Yongsan – Dongincheon)
 GI LE: Gyeongin Limited Express (Yongsan – Dongincheon)
 GB A: Gyeongbu Express (Cheongnyangni – Cheonan or Sinchang(Soonchunhyang Univ.))
 GB B: Gyeongbu Express (Seoul – Cheonan or Sinchang(Soonchunhyang Univ.))
※ Only Korail trains are used for express trains.
Key:

Yeongdeungpo – Gwangmyeong shuttle service

Byeongjeom Depot spur service

Historical Timeline 

1974
August 15: Line 1 is officially opened with 9 stations from Seoul to Cheongnyangni (whose distance is ), creating a system of 28 stations (excluding the 9 metro stations) on national railroads from Seongbuk station (now: Kwangwoon University station, the then-northern terminus) to Incheon Station and Suwon Station. Korail is named Korean National Railroad, with Line 1 just referring to the Seoul-Cheongnyangni section.

1978
December 9: The Gyeongwon Line from Yongsan to Seongbuk opens as a new branch, with Ichon and Seongsu (now part of the Jungang Line).

1979
February 1: Yuljeon Station is opened.

1980
January 5: Sinimun Station is opened.
April 1: Seobinggo, Hannam and Hoegi (now part of the Jungang Line) are opened.
July 10: Seongsu is renamed Eungbong Station

1982
August 2: Seoksu Station is opened.

1984
January 1: Yuljeon Station is renamed Seongdae-ap Station.
May 22: Sindorim Station is opened.
November 20: Baegun Station is opened.

1985
January 14: Seokgye Station is opened.
April 20: Chang-dong is opened as a northward extension.
August 22: Wolgye and Nokcheon are opened.
October 18: Oksu Station (now part of the Jungang Line) is opened.

1986
September 2: 6 stations from Uijeongbu to Chang-dong are opened as a northward extension.

1987
October 5: Uijeongbu Bukbu Station is opened.
December 31: Jung-dong Station is opened.

1988
January 16: Onsu Station is opened.
October 25: The Ansan Line is opened as a southward branch, from Geumjeong Station to Ansan Station.

1994
July 11: Ganseok and Dowon are opened.
December 1: Seongdae-ap Station is renamed to Sungkyunkwan University.

1995
February 16: Guil Station is opened.

1996
January 1: Hwigyeong Station is renamed to Hankuk University of Foreign Studies Station
March 28: Bugae Station is opened.

1997
April 30: Sosa Station is opened.

1998
January 7: Singil and Doksan are opened.

2000
Korea National Railroad and Line 1 are integrated as Seoul (Metropolitan) Subway Line 1.

2001
November 30: Dohwa Station is opened.

2003
April 30: Seryu and Byeongjeom are opened as a southward extension. The Ansan Line service is replaced with an extended Seoul Subway Line 4.

2004
August 25: Bugok Station is renamed Uiwang Station.

2005
January 20: 8 stations from Byeongjeom to Cheonan are opened as another southward extension.
December 16: The Gyeongwon Line branch from Yongsan Station to Hoegi Station and the Jungang Line from Hoegi Station to Deokso Station open and are renamed to the separate Yongsan-Deokso Line. This service was the predecessor to the current Jungang Line.
December 21: Dongmyo Station is opened.
December 27: Sema and Osan College Stations are opened.

2006
June 30: Jinwi and Jije Stations are opened.
July 1: Garibong Station is renamed to Gasan Digital Complex.
December 15: 8 stations from Soyosan to Uijeongbu Bukbu are opened as a northward extension. A spur line to Gwangmyeong Station is created. Uijeongbu Bukbu Station is renamed to Ganeung.

2007
December 28: Deokgye Station is opened.

2008
December 15: 6 stations from Cheonan to Sinchang(Soonchunhyang Univ.) are opened as another southward extension.
December 29: Siheung Station is renamed to Geumcheon-gu Office.

2010
January 21: Dangjeong Station is opened.
February 26: Seodongtan Station is opened.

2015
February 3: Gyeongin Line express trains start stopping at Gaebong and Jemulpo stations.

2017
July 6: A new limited express service was launched between Yongsan and Dongincheon stations.

2019
December 30: All Gyeongbu Line express trains start stopping at Geumjeong and Sungkyunkwan University stations and are extended to Cheongnyangni. Gyeongbu Line express trains no longer stop at Gunpo station.

2021
October 30: Tangjeong station opened as an in-fill station between Asan and Baebang.

Future Plans 
Line 1 will be extended northward from Soyosan Station to Yeoncheon Station on the Gyeongwon Line, replacing the current "Commuter Train" service operating there. Construction on this extension began in September 2014 and is expected to be completed in May 2023.

Rolling stock

Current 
 Seoul Metro 1000 series
 Rheostat-controlled electric car (rebuilt cars) – since 1974
 VVVF inverter-controlled electric car – since 1999
 Korail Class 311000
 First generation – since 1996
 Second generation – since 2003
 Third generation – since 2005
 Fourth generation – since 2019 (Korail Class 312000)
 Korail Class 319000 (for Gwangmyeong Shuttle) – since 2006

Former 
 Seoul Metro 1000 series
 Rheostat-controlled electric car (1st batch) – 1974-2002
 Korail Class 1000
 First generation – 1974-2004 (some non-driving cars lasted until 2014)
 Second generation – 1986-2017 (some non-driving cars lasted until 2019)
 Third generation – 1994-2020

Depots and facilities 
(from north to south)
 Majeon signal box between Deokye and Yangju Stations
 Chang-dong Depot (shared with Line 4)
 Seongbuk Depot
 Imun Depot
 Guro Depot
 Siheung Depot (actually after Oido Station on Line 4, also used for heavy maintenance of Line 1 trains owned by Korail, accessed by a crossover located after Geumjeong Station)
 Byeongjeom Depot

See also 
 Subways in South Korea
 Seoul Metropolitan Subway
 S-train

References

External links 
 Map, station and route finder
 UrbanRail.Net

 
Seoul Metropolitan Subway lines
Railway lines opened in 1974
1500 V DC railway electrification
25 kV AC railway electrification